The 2019 Men's Oceania Cup was the eleventh edition of the men's field hockey tournament. It was held from 5 to 8 September in Rockhampton.

The tournament served as a qualifier for the 2020 Summer Olympics.

Australia won the tournament for the eleventh time, finishing ahead of New Zealand at the conclusion of the pool stage.

Background
Australia were the ten-time back-to-back defending champions. The winners of the Cup earned an automatic place at the 2020 Olympic Games.

The hosting announcement of the Rockhampton Hockey Association came as $5 million was being invested into the hockey centre to upgrade the facilities. In March 2019, Stirling Hinchliffe, MLA for Sandgate and Minister for Local Government, Racing and Multicultural Affairs announced that the Government of Queensland had invested $2.5 million into the Kalka Shades, the home of the Rockhampton Hockey Association.

Teams

Head Coach: Colin Batch

Tom Craig
Corey Weyer
Jake Harvie
Tom Wickham
Matthew Dawson
Jacob Anderson
Eddie Ockenden (C)
Jacob Whetton
Blake Govers
Tim Howard
Aran Zalewski (C)
Matthew Swann
Flynn Ogilvie
Daniel Beale
Tyler Lovell (C)
Timothy Brand
Andrew Charter (GK)
Jeremy Hayward

Head Coach: Darren Smith

Cory Bennett
Dane Lett
Nick Ross
Richard Joyce (GK)
Jacob Smith
Sam Lane
Marcus Child
Jared Panchia
George Enersen (GK)
Nic Woods
Kane Russell 
Blair Tarrant (C)
Arun Panchia
Shea McAleese
Stephen Jenness
Hugo Inglis
George Muir
Hayden Phillips

Results
All times are local (AEST).

Pool

Fixtures

Statistics

Final standings

Goalscorers

References

External links
International Hockey Federation

Oceania Cup
Oceania Cup
Oceania Cup
International field hockey competitions hosted by Australia
Oceania Cup
Oceania Cup
Field hockey at the Summer Olympics – Oceanian qualification
Sport in Rockhampton